Keshar Kumari Devi is an Indian politician. She was elected to the Lok Sabha, lower house of the Parliament of India from Raipur as member of the Indian National Congress.

References

India MPs 1957–1962
India MPs 1962–1967
Lok Sabha members from Madhya Pradesh
Indian National Congress politicians from Madhya Pradesh